The Blood Brothers was an American post-hardcore band which formed in 1997. The group was based in Seattle's Eastside suburbs and released five full-length albums before their 2007 breakup, as well as numerous side projects on behalf of the members. They reunited for a series of shows surrounding and including FYF Fest in 2014.

Origins
Singers Jordan Blilie and Johnny Whitney and drummer Mark Gajadhar formed the band from a previous musical endeavor, a band called Vade that they were involved with when they were 15 years old.  Joining with bassist Morgan Henderson and guitarist Devin Welch the following year, the Blood Brothers were born in August 1997.  The band recorded their first 7-inch record for $200 in a basement the following year.  After replacing Welch with guitarist Cody Votolato (who is a year younger than the rest of the band), the current lineup was complete.  The band left on their first tour immediately after Votolato graduated from high school. In July 2002, the band toured the United States with Vermont-based math rock band The Cancer Conspiracy and Florida-based indie rock band The Rocking Horse Winner.

Hiatus and breakup
Music website Punknews.org reported that the band was going on hiatus, though they had initially reported the situation as a breakup.  The news story linked to a forum post by Three One G owner Justin Pearson, who was replying to a post about the breakup of Some Girls.  He only stated "the blood bros broke up."

The band officially broke up in June 2007, but kept the information from the public until November 2007.  Rumors of the disbandment can be traced as far back as July.

The Blood Brothers were expected to make an announcement about their future in early 2008, but instead officially announced the breakup on November 8, 2007:

In a December 2008 interview with Seattle newspaper The Stranger, Blilie gave the following reason for the band's breakup:

It was announced on October 19, 2009, that Epitaph Records would be re-issuing the band's last four full-length albums with added b-sides, live tracks and remixes.

Musical style

The Blood Brothers is commonly seen as a post-hardcore band and incorporate elements from a number of genres including experimental, screamo, noise, avant-garde, and dance.

The band is particularly notable for having the unique dueling vocals of Johnny Whitney and Jordan Blilie. The style of guitar playing showcased by Votolato has greatly changed over time, most notably between the heavy, discordant sound of ...Burn, Piano Island, Burn and the minimalist lead lines of Crimes, where the energy of the drums and vocals tends to make up for the lack of thick distortion. Whitney's voice is generally accepted to have evolved from the slurred, venomous drawl on This Adultery Is Ripe to the high-pitched squeals ("like a child being tortured ")  heard on Crimes, while Blilie's voice has grown more distinctive while maintaining the same low, robust ferocity. The band has cited Drive Like Jehu, Gang of Four, Botch, and Antioch Arrow, among others, as influences.

The Blood Brothers' last album, Young Machetes, was released on October 10, 2006, with Fugazi member Guy Picciotto co-producing it.

Other projects
Several members of the band have been or are currently involved in other projects:
 Johnny Whitney and Mark Gajadhar released an album "Chandeliers in the Savannah" in 2005 under the name Neon Blonde after the release of "Crimes", 2004.  An EP was also released earlier in 2005.
 Along with members of The Locust and Yeah Yeah Yeahs, Jordan Blilie and Cody Votolato formed Head Wound City shortly after the release of Crimes and released a self-titled EP. The band regrouped and released an album 'A New Wave of Violence' on May 13, 2016.
 In 2007, Johnny Whitney and Cody Votolato joined with Jay Clark (formerly of Pretty Girls Make Graves) to start Jaguar Love.  The band's first release was a limited edition self-titled EP, which was released June 3 that year. On December 29, 2007, they announced they were to begin recording their first full-length record. The record, Take Me To The Sea, was released August 19, 2008. Their second album, Hologram Jams, was released March 2, 2010.
 Johnny Whitney, along with Devin Welch and Hannah Blilie, played in The Vogue (1999–2000), which evolved into Soiled Doves (2000–2001) after the departure of their keyboardist. The Vogue released an album in 2000, As Brass As Satin. Soiled Doves released in album in 2003, Soiled Life.
 Johnny Whitney, along with his wife Amy Carlsen, started a clothing company called Crystal City Clothing.  To date, they have produced shirts for Panic! at the Disco, Thursday, and Rocky Votolato.  They also produced a majority of the merchandise designs for The Blood Brothers for several years.
 Jordan Blilie, Mark Gajadhar and Morgan Henderson formed the band Past Lives in late 2007, with original Blood Brothers guitarist Devin Welch. Their debut EP, Strange Symmetry, was made available for digital download in August 2008. They have also recorded a 5-song suite for Issue 7 of The Journal of Popular Noise, due June 2008. On February 23, 2010, the band released their debut full-length for Suicide Squeeze Records, Tapestry of Webs.
 Morgan Henderson has a solo electronic project by the name of O, Hunter.  He has done remixes of some songs for some bands, such as Minus The Bear. He spent much of 2010 writing and recording Helplessness Blues by the Fleet Foxes, and currently is touring with them as of 2017.
 Mark Gajadhar performs as DJ Gajamagic. Under this name he has formed the group Champagne Champagne with rapper Pearl Dragon and Thomas Gray.  DJ Gajamagic is also one half of WEEKEND with the other half being Ryann Donnelly from Schoolyard Heroes. In 2014, Gajadhar joined Hardly Art band Grave Babies as drummer.
 Cody Votolato is currently the guitarist in Merge Records band Telekinesis and also the touring guitarist for Cold Cave.

Members
Final lineup

 Jordan Blilie – vocals, guitars, piano (1997–2007, 2014)
 Johnny Whitney – vocals, keyboards, piano, programming (1997–2007, 2014)
 Mark Gajadhar – drums, percussion (1997–2007, 2014)
 Morgan Henderson – bass guitar, guitars, keyboards, backing vocals (1997–2007, 2014)
 Cody Votolato – guitars, percussion, backing vocals (1999–2007, 2014)

Former members
 Devin Welch – guitars (1997–1999)

Discography

Albums
 This Adultery Is Ripe (2000)
 March on Electric Children (2002)
 ...Burn, Piano Island, Burn (2003)
 Crimes (2004) No. 157 US
 Young Machetes (2006) No. 92 US

EPs
The Blood Brothers (1997)
Home Alive '98 split 7-inch with Stiletto (1998)
Dynamic Sound! split 7-inch with Milemarker (1999)
Rumors Laid Waste (2003)
Love Rhymes with Hideous Car Wreck (2005)

Singles
 "Ambulance vs. Ambulance" (2003)
 "Love Rhymes with Hideous Car Wreck" (2004)
 "Laser Life" (2006)
 "Set Fire to the Face on Fire" (2007)

Music videos
 Ambulance vs. Ambulance (2003)
 Cecilia and the Silhouette Saloon (2003)
 Love Rhymes with Hideous Car Wreck (2004)
 Laser Life (2006)
 Set Fire to the Face on Fire (2007)

DVDs
 Jungle Rules Live (2003)
 This Is Circumstantial Evidence (2003)
 The Fest 3 (2004)

Other appearances
 The Blood Brothers produced a cover of the song Under Pressure which appeared on the Queen tribute album Dynamite With a Laser Beam.
 The band also covered Gang of Four's "Anthrax" for a tribute album that never materialized.  A remix can be found on the Love Rhymes with Hideous Car Wreck EP.
 The band performed 'Trash Flavored Trash' on ABC's 'Live with Jimmy Kimmel!' in Sept., 2005.
 The band performed "Set Fire To The Face On Fire" and "Laser Life" on Season 2, Episode 6 of IFC's The Henry Rollins Show, May 18, 2007

Family connections
Several members of the band have familial connections to other notable Pacific Northwest-based bands:
 Cody Votolato's older brother Rocky Votolato is a successful solo folk artist and was a member of Waxwing with Cody.  His oldest brother is Sonny Votolato, who plays guitar for numerous bands, including Slender Means, Bugs in Amber, and Blue Checkered Record Player.
 Mark Gajadhar's older brother is Rudy Gajadhar, the drummer of Gatsbys American Dream and formerly of Waxwing.  Rudy was in Waxwing at the same time as Cody's brother Rocky.
 Jordan Blilie's twin sister Hannah Blilie is the drummer for The Gossip.

References

External links

American post-hardcore musical groups
Musical groups established in 1997
Musical groups disestablished in 2007
Musical groups reestablished in 2014
Musical groups from Washington (state)
V2 Records artists
Wichita Recordings artists
Three One G artists